The 1990 British League season was the 56th season of the top tier of speedway in the United Kingdom and the 26th known as the British League.

Summary
Reading Racers won the league for the first time since 1980. The domination of speedway in recent years by Oxford Cheetahs, Coventry Bees and Cradley Heathens had come to an end. The Reading team was an extremely strong all round squad, highlighted by the fact that Per Jonsson who finished third in the Reading averages would become World Champion by the end of the season. Veteran English international Jeremy Doncaster and their new Australian signing Todd Wiltshire topped the Reading averages and they were supported by fans favourite Jan Andersson, Dave Mullett and Tony Olsson. The team went on to complete the league and cup double after beating Bradford in the cup final. Hans Nielsen of Oxford topped the averages for an incredible eighth season running and also won the British League Riders' Championship for the third time.

Final table
M = Matches; W = Wins; D = Draws; L = Losses; Pts = Total Points

British League Knockout Cup
The 1990 Sppedway Star British League Knockout Cup was the 52nd edition of the Knockout Cup for tier one teams. Reading Racers were the winners.

First round

Quarter-finals

Semi-finals

Final

First leg

Second leg

Reading Racers were declared Knockout Cup Champions, winning on aggregate 98-82.

Final leading averages

Riders & final averages
Belle Vue

 8.42
 8.00
 7.18
 7.01
 6.69
 5.76
 4.73
 3.08

Bradford

 8.63
 8.50
 7.69 
 6.90 
 6.16
 6.13
 2.02
 2.00

Coventry

 8.93
 7.82 
 6.77 
 5.85
 5.74
 5.55
 5.33
 2.86
 1.95
 0.67

Cradley Heath

 9.37
 8.73
 6.80
 6.21
 6.18
 5.51
 2.48

King's Lynn

 7.77
 7.38 
 7.09
 5.90
 5.63
 5.57
 5.33
 0.89

Oxford

 10.36 
 8.26
 7.52
 5.81
 5.54
 5.05
 3.47
 1.84

Reading

 9.09
 8.77
 8.39
 7.22
 6.42
 6.31
 6.25
 2.51
 2.16

Swindon

 8.57
 7.91
 7.53
 7.31
 7.15
 7.01
 5.67
 5.08

Wolverhampton

 8.87
 8.85
 6.18
 5.70
 5.57
 5.42
 4.73
 3.45

See also
List of United Kingdom Speedway League Champions
Knockout Cup (speedway)

References

British League
1990 in British motorsport